In Greek mythology, Argyra (Ancient Greek: Ἀργυρᾶ) was one of the Naiads, a nymph who lived in a well. There was a city in ancient Achaea, also named Argyra, that was the site of a spring.

Mythology 
According to legend, the nymph Argyra was in love with a shepherd named Selemnus whom she visited frequently. But when he aged and his youthful beauty vanished, she forsook him. When the boy died of grief, the goddess Aphrodite out of pity changed him into a river. There was a popular belief in Achaia that a forsaken lover who bathes in this river will forget their pain.

Notes

References 

 Pausanias, Description of Greece with an English Translation by W.H.S. Jones, Litt.D., and H.A. Ormerod, M.A., in 4 Volumes. Cambridge, MA, Harvard University Press; London, William Heinemann Ltd. 1918. . Online version at the Perseus Digital Library
 Pausanias, Graeciae Descriptio. 3 vols. Leipzig, Teubner. 1903.  Greek text available at the Perseus Digital Library.

Naiads
Mythology of Achaea